Paracrangonyx is a genus of amphipods in the family Paracrangonyctidae, comprising two species, Paracrangonyx compactus and Paracrangonyz winterbourni.

P. compactus is found only in Canterbury, New Zealand, at Eyreton, Leeston, and St Albans.

P. winterbourni has only been found at Templeton, on the Canterbury Plains of South Island.

References

Gammaridea
Freshwater crustaceans of New Zealand
Taxa named by Thomas Roscoe Rede Stebbing